William Sydney Burt (25 July 1896 – 1 May 1969) was an Australian rules footballer who played with Collingwood in the Victorian Football League (VFL).

Notes

External links 

Syd Burt's profile at Collingwood Forever

1896 births
1969 deaths
Australian rules footballers from Victoria (Australia)
Collingwood Football Club players
Australian military personnel of World War I